Nothopleurus is a genus of beetles in the family Cerambycidae, containing the following species:

 Nothopleurus arabicus (Buquet, 1843)
 Nothopleurus castaneum (Casey, 1924)
 Nothopleurus lobigenis Bates, 1884
 Nothopleurus madericus (Skiles, 1978)
 Nothopleurus subsulcatus (Dalman, 1823)

References

Prioninae